Paralasianthus is a genus of flowering plants belonging to the family Rubiaceae.

Its native range is Hainan, Thailand to Papuasia.

Species:

Paralasianthus dichotomus 
Paralasianthus hainanensis 
Paralasianthus lowianus 
Paralasianthus zhengyianus

References

Rubiaceae
Rubiaceae genera